Jules–Auguste Lair (25 May 1836 – 16 May 1907) was a French lawyer, businessman and scholar. 
At the École des Chartes he studied palaeography, and was offered a position with the Archives, but he decided instead to become a lawyer. 
At the age of 25 he became director of a warehousing company, and over the next forty years was involved in various major enterprises including the first telephone network in France.
At the same time, he always set aside time for historical work, and published many articles and books on aspects of French history from the Middle Ages to the French Revolution.

Life

Early years

Jules-Auguste Lair was born in Caen on 25 May 1836.
His family was prosperous. 
His father, a trader in butter, died while he was a child.
He studied at the Collège Royal de Caen, where he was a brilliant pupil.
He then moved to Paris where he attended the École des Chartes and studied archival palaeography.
He entered the École des Chartes in the autumn of 1855, and graduated first in 1858, ahead of Siméon Luce.

Lair was offered a position with the Archives, but chose to follow a career as a lawyer.
He earned a doctorate from the Faculty of Law in Paris in 1859.
He enrolled at the Bar of Paris, where he pleaded some cases.
During the 1860–61 judicial year he was one of the secretaries of the Conférence des avocats du barreau de Paris.
He entered the office of Sébastien Joseph Boulatignier(fr), President of the litigation section in the Council of State.
He also worked for Antoine Blanche, Advocate General at the Court of Cassation.

Businessman

In 1860, at the age of 25 Lair accepted the job of deputy director of the new Compagnie des Entrepôts et Magasins généraux de Paris (Paris Warehouse and General Stores Company) under M. Moranvillé, a friend of Boulatignier.
The company was formed from assets of the failed Docks Napoléon.
Lair was in charge of litigation.
By 1870 the company was well organized, financially secure and doing more business than had been foreseen for the original Docks Napoléon.

The Franco-Prussian War broke out in 1870.
Lair became a captain in the staff of General Trochu in the National Guard.
He was awarded the Cross of the Legion of Honour by decree of 30 January 1871.
During the Paris Commune in 1871 the warehouses in the Villette and Pont de Flandre(fr) quarters were occupied by the most fervent partisans of the Commune, and burned down.
After the disaster Moranvillé and Lair managed to raise funds to rebuild,  which they achieved within two years.
In 1873 Moranvillé retired and Lair became director of the company. 
He would hold this position for 33 years.
In 1873 he married a Mlle Dehaussy, from a family that was always interested in intellectual pursuits and particularly the arts.

Lair bought the Magasins Généraux d'Auhervilliers et de Saint-Denis, doubling the size of the enterprise.
In 1881, after the first telephony experiments, Lair conceived the great project of organizing a telephone network in France.
Jules Lair organized the Société générale des Téléphones(fr) in 1881, which was taken over by the state in 1889. 
Lazare Weiller collaborated with Lair in manufacturing and distributing telephones.
Lair was also interested in underwater telegraphy, and wanted to create a network of submarine cable connecting France to her colonies.
The army and navy strongly supported this, but it did not achieve all its goals due to opposition from the Deputy of Le Havre. 
Lair entered into various other enterprises associated with the Crédit Industriel et Commercial.
His senior management positions in addition to running the Magasins généraux included:
President of the Société générale des téléphones, 1881–89
President of the Comptoir des entrepôts, 1891
President of the Compagnie française des télégraphes sous-marins, 1898
Vice-President of the Crédit industriel, 1895
President of the Société des mines de Czeladz, 1897
Vice-President of the Société française des métaux, 1899
President of the Société des docks de Rouen, 1902
President of the Société des aciéries de France, 1902

Literary work

Throughout his business career, Lair always set aside time for historical work.
He was particularly interested in the history of his native Normandy.
In 1860 he published a History of the Parliament of Normandy from its translation to Caen in June 1589 until its return to Rouen in April 1594.
The first volume of his Étude sur les origines de l'évêché de Bayeux (1862) prompted a lengthy rebuttal by the Abbé L. Tapin, also published in 1862.
He published a new edition of Dudo of Saint-Quentin's History of the Normans which was published in Caen under the title De moribus et actis primorum Normanniae ducum in the memoirs of the Société des Antiquaires de Normandie.
His long preface tried to establish that Dudo was a reliable historical source, which he was not, and the text has been criticized for careless collation and transcription. 
However, it has not been superseded.

As a personal gift General Trochu gave Lair a collection of letters written from abroad during the French Revolution about the events of that period, which Lair began publishing from 1872 with the help of Émile Legrand(fr).
Lair's father-in-law had a country house in Bures-sur-Yvette, in the Vallée de Chevreuse, and this became an important retreat for Lair whan he could find time away from business.
He wrote an engaging history of the village of Bures.
While dealing with financiers and competitors, he wrote studies of such people as Louise de La Vallière, Nicolas Fouquet and Cardinal Richelieu.
He continued to publish diverse works on aspects of the Middle Ages, the Sun King and the French Revolution.
He always remained linked to Caen as a member of the Société des Antiquaires de Normandie, while in Paris he was an active member of the Société de l'École des Chartes.

Lair died in Paris on 16 May 1907.
At the time of his death from bronchitis he was working on the Mémoires de Richelieu.

Works

Works published by Lair include:

Notes

Citations

Sources

,

1836 births
1907 deaths
Businesspeople from Caen
École Nationale des Chartes alumni
Historians of France
19th-century French historians
French businesspeople
Chevaliers of the Légion d'honneur